Big D may refer to:

People
 Don Drysdale (1936–1993), Major League Baseball pitcher
 Bigg D (born 1972), record producer from Miami, Florida

Fiction
 Dudley Dursley, a character in J. K. Rowling's Harry Potter novels
 Damn (spelled damme), referred to euphemistically in Gilbert and Sullivan's H.M.S. Pinafore
 A character in the 2005 Chinese film Election
 A character in the 1966 animated series The Impossibles

Music
 Big D and the Kids Table, an American ska band
 "Big D" (song), a song in Frank Loesser's 1956 Broadway musical The Most Happy Fella
 "Goin' Through the Big D", a song performed by Mark Chesnutt

Radio
 "Big D 103", a former moniker of WDRC-FM in Hartford, Connecticut
 Big D Jamboree, an American country music radio show
 Big D and Bubba, an American radio show

Other uses
 Divorce
 Dallas, Texas, eighth-largest city in the United States
 Big D (peanuts), British brand of snack foods
 The original name of the Dallas Cowboys mascot Rowdy
 Part of the National Supermarkets chain
 Edmonton Oilers defenceman Vincent Desharnais

See also
 D (disambiguation)